Stare Gagowy  is a village in the administrative district of Gmina Lubień Kujawski, within Włocławek County, Kuyavian-Pomeranian Voivodeship, in north-central Poland.

The village has a population of 260.

References

Stare Gagowy